Dance score may refer to:
 Dance notation that describes a dance
 Sheet music for a dance
 A performance score given by a judge at a dance competition